Benjamin James Stockham (born July 8, 2000) is an American television and film actor, known for his role of Robby Gunderson in the 2010 Fox sitcom Sons of Tucson, and previously starred as Xander Gilchrist in the NBC sitcom 1600 Penn.

He played Marcus Bowa in the NBC comedy About a Boy.

Life and career
Born in La Mesa, California, and raised in nearby Santee, currently resides in Los Angeles, California. In addition to acting, Stockham enjoys drawing, and he has been asked to illustrate a children's book.

Stockham first appearance was in the film Quarantine. He also appeared in a long running Fidelity commercial as well as several other national spots. He has appeared in multiple TV shows. His big breakthrough came in the FOX sitcom Sons of Tucson as Robby Gunderson.

He has also appeared in TV movies and films including Decoding Annie Parker, Saving Santa and Simon Says and TV shows such as Rizzoli & Isles, CSI: NY, NCIS and Criminal Minds.

Benjamin Stockham starred in 2013 as Xander Gilchrist, the youngest family member living in the White House, in the NBC family comedy 1600 Penn.

He also played Marcus in the NBC comedy About a Boy.

In 2014, Stockham appeared in a public service announcement for the My Life My Power Program speaking out against bullying.

Filmography

References

External links 
 

2000 births
Living people
American male child actors
American male television actors
People from La Mesa, California
Male actors from California
21st-century American male actors